Antonio Pettigrew (November 3, 1967 – August 10, 2010) was an American sprinter who specialized in the 400 meters.

Early life and career 
Pettigrew was born in Macon, Georgia.

While attending St. Augustine's College in Raleigh, North Carolina, Pettigrew was a four-time NCAA Division II champion in the 400 meter race. He came to prominence at the 1991 World Championships, where he won the 400 m gold medal and a silver medal in the 4 x 400 meters relay.

At the 2000 Summer Olympics in Sydney, Pettigrew threw his gold medal-winning Adidas spikes into the crowd after winning the 4 × 400 m final for the USA.

Controversies 
In 2008, prosecution documents related to the trial of coach Trevor Graham listed Pettigrew as one of Graham's athletes to have used performance-enhancing drugs. Pettigrew then admitted to using performance-enhancing drugs and testified against Graham at his trial in May 2008.

Although the IAAF rules currently do not retroactively alter results more than eight years after the event, Pettigrew voluntarily returned the medals he won in that period. The 2000 Sydney Olympics 4 × 400 m U.S. relay team was stripped of their medals after Pettigrew admitted that he had used performance-enhancing drugs during that time.

He received a two-year athletics ban in 2008, even though he had already retired from the track by then.

Death 
Pettigrew was found dead at age 42 in the back seat of his locked car in Chatham County, North Carolina, on August 10, 2010, and evidence of sleeping pills was found by police. On October 13, an autopsy report stated that he had died by suicide as a result of overdosing on a medication containing diphenhydramine. Pettigrew was an assistant coach at the University of North Carolina at the time of his death.

Personal bests 

Main information from IAAF Profile.
Record information from All-Athletics.com.

See also 
 BALCO Scandal
 List of sportspeople sanctioned for doping offences

References

External links 
 

1967 births
2010 suicides
American male sprinters
African-American male track and field athletes
American sportspeople in doping cases
Athletes (track and field) at the 2000 Summer Olympics
Olympic track and field athletes of the United States
Track and field athletes from Raleigh, North Carolina
Drug-related suicides in North Carolina
Competitors stripped of Summer Olympics medals
World Athletics Championships medalists
St. Augustine's University (North Carolina) alumni
St. Augustine's Falcons men's track and field athletes
Doping cases in athletics
Goodwill Games medalists in athletics
Athletes stripped of World Athletics Championships medals
World Athletics Championships winners
Competitors at the 1998 Goodwill Games
Competitors at the 2001 Goodwill Games
Competitors at the 1990 Goodwill Games
2010 deaths
North Carolina Tar Heels track and field coaches